Agostinho Stefan Januszewicz O.F.M. Conv. (29 November 1930 – 20 March 2011) was the Roman Catholic bishop of the Roman Catholic Diocese of Luziânia, Brazil.

Born in Podwojponie, a village in Podlaskie Voivodeship, Poland, just on the Polish-Lithuanian border. Januszewicz was ordained a Franciscan priest in 1958. In 1989, he was named Roman Catholic bishop of the Roman Catholic Diocese of Luziânia, but resigned in 2004. He died of cancer on 20 March 2011 in Juruá, Amazonas, where he was buried.

References

1930 births
2011 deaths
Polish Roman Catholic priests
20th-century Roman Catholic bishops in Brazil
Conventual Franciscan bishops
Deaths from cancer in Amazonas (Brazilian state)
21st-century Roman Catholic bishops in Brazil
Roman Catholic bishops of Luziânia